El Privilegio de Amar (Literal English translation: The Privilege to Love, International English title: The Right to Love) is a Mexican telenovela produced by Carla Estrada for Televisa. It aired on Canal de las Estrellas from July 27, 1998, to February 26, 1999. El Privilegio de Amar is a remake of the 1985 Venezuelan novela, Cristal. El Privilegio de Amar is the highest-rated television program in Mexico to date, it registered an average of 34.8 percent of TV audience. The telenovela received TVyNovelas Award for Best Telenovela, in 1999.

The telenovela tells the story of a fashion designer, Luciana, who begins searching for the daughter she abandoned years earlier, unaware the girl is none other than Cristina, a model in Luciana's fashion house who has fallen in love with Luciana's stepson.

Starring Adela Noriega, Helena Rojo, Andrés García, René Strickler, Enrique Rocha, Cynthia Klitbo, Nuria Bages, César Évora and Marga López.

Plot
The young seminarian Juan de la Cruz arrives for a visit at the home of his mother, Ana Joaquina, a religious fanatic who has always imposed her will upon her son and pushed him to serve God. Working in Ana Joaquina's house is the young Luciana, an innocent dreamer of a girl who falls in love with Juan.

One night, carried away by youthful passion, they tenderly and innocently give in to their desires.  Upon discovering that Luciana is pregnant, Ana Joaquina demands to know the identity of the child's father; when Luciana admits that it is Juan de la Cruz, Ana Joaquina fires Luciana, leaving her destitute.

After giving birth to a daughter, Luciana leaves her baby on the doorstep of a wealthy house with the hope that the little girl will be raised there, but she is instead taken to an orphanage.  In order to survive, Luciana becomes involved with many undesirable men, including Pedro Trujillo, a terrible man who hits and abuses her.

Twenty years later, Cristina, Luciana's daughter, has grown up happily in the orphanage although she is forever curious to know who her mother is; meanwhile, Luciana is the owner of a popular fashion house and the wife of the well-known actor Andrés Duval, with whom she has two children, Lizbeth and Víctor Manuel.

Lizbeth, who is Luciana and Andrés's daughter, is capricious and spoiled because she is accustomed to always having what she wants, while Víctor Manuel, who is Andrés's son with his first wife, is like a son to Luciana and works at her fashion house.

Her happy and caring family provokes Luciana to begin searching for the daughter she abandoned so many years ago; however, her family knows nothing about Cristina because Luciana has never revealed a single detail about her past for fear of her husband's reaction.  Cristina, upon leaving the orphanage, rents a simple apartment with Lorenza and Maclovia.

Lorenza is a beautiful young woman, provocative and very self-confident, whereas Maclovia is reserved, timid, and intelligent. Lorenza meets Andrés and they become lovers as Andrés comes to desire the passion and love that Luciana never gave him; meanwhile, Cristina, thanks to Lorenza, obtains work as a model in Luciana's fashion house.

Cristina and Víctor Manuel fall in love and begin to date, but when Luciana discovers their relationship she fires Cristina and tries to convince her son that he should marry Tamara, trapping him with the lie that she is carrying his child when in reality the child is that of Nicolás Obregón, Andrés's friend.

Cristina discovers that she is pregnant by Víctor Manuel but decides to stay quiet out of respect for the family that he has formed.  At this point, Alonso comes into Cristina's life offering a name for her daughter and love for her; however, Cristina cannot return his feelings because she does not love him.

Nonetheless, Cristina begins to fight for her daughter and becomes a very successful woman. This status that she little by little gains as a model unites her again with Víctor Manuel who lives a hellish life with Tamara; he eventually leaves her to be happy with Cristina and thus, they are able to enjoy together the privilege of loving.

Cast

Awards and nominations

References

External links

1998 telenovelas
Mexican telenovelas
1998 Mexican television series debuts
1999 Mexican television series endings
Television shows set in Mexico City
Televisa telenovelas
Mexican television series based on Venezuelan television series
Spanish-language telenovelas